I Am the Cheese is a 1983 American film adaptation of Robert Cormier's 1977 novel of the same name, about a young man's journey to find the truth behind his family. The film was directed by Robert Jiras and filmed in Vermont.

Plot
Fifteen year old Adam Farmer (Robert MacNaughton) seeks to unearth the many secrets locked in his subconscious. Adam's journey through his mind is paralleled with a bike trip to Rutterburg, Vermont, with a package for his father. As he travels through several small towns, he starts to remember past events from his life.

Adam's trip is prompted by a call from his girlfriend, Amy (Cynthia Nixon), who says her father met a reporter from Adam's alleged hometown of Rawlings, Pennsylvania, and the reporter had never heard of anyone named Farmer living there. Suspicious, Adam begins spying on his parents and finds two birth certificates with his name on them, but with different birthdates - February 14 (Valentine's Day) and July 14 (Bastille Day). Adam confronts his father, who admits some shocking truths.

Adam's real name is Paul Delmonte and the family was forced to relocate in a Witness Protection-type program after his father testified in state and federal trials against corrupt government officials. In reality, Adam is not biking to Vermont; he is riding in circles around the psychiatric facility where he has been held for the past three years, and the people he meets along the way are patients and workers at the facility. His "journey" is a quest to discover the whereabouts of his parents, who mysteriously disappeared (in truth, they were "terminated" by the adversaries they sought to elude). The memories Adam recounts are documented in "psychiatric sessions," which are, in fact, interviews to determine whether or not he knows more about his father's involvement with the government than he's telling. Adam's final interview ends with two possible outcomes, neither of which bode well for the boy: "Terminating" him or continuing to question him until he dies.

Cast
 Robert MacNaughton as Paul Delmonte / Adam Farmer
 Frank McGurren as young Adam
 Cynthia Nixon as Amy Hertz
 Robert Wagner as Dr. Brint
 Don Murray as Anthony Delmonte / David Farmer
 Hope Lange as Betty Farmer
 Lee Richardson as Mr. Grey
 Robert Cormier as Mr. Hertz
 John Fiedler as Arnold

External links

References

1983 films
1983 drama films
American drama films
Films based on American novels
American independent films
1983 independent films
Films about witness protection
1980s English-language films
1980s American films